Sir John Aubrey, 6th Baronet (4 June 1739 – 14 March 1826) was a British Tory politician. In 1786, he succeeded to his father's baronetcy.

Baptised in Boarstall in Buckinghamshire on 2 July 1739, he was the son of Sir Thomas Aubrey, 5th Baronet and Martha, daughter of Richard Carter, of Chilton, Buckinghamshire, Chief Justice of Glamorgan. Aubrey was educated at Westminster School and at Christ Church, Oxford, where he graduated as a Doctor of Civil Laws in 1763. Aubrey was Lord Commissioner of the Admiralty in 1782 and Lord of the Treasury from 1783 to 1789.

Between 1768 and 1774 and between 1780 and 1784, Aubrey was Member of Parliament (MP) for Wallingford. He was further MP for Aylesbury from 1774 to 1780, for Buckinghamshire from 1784 to 1790 and for Clitheroe from 1790 to 1796. Aubrey was also Member of Parliament for Aldeburgh from 1796 to 1812, for Steyning from 1812 to 1820 and for Horsham from 1820 to 1826, eventually becoming the Father of the House as the longest-serving member. He died in Dorton House in Buckinghamshire and was buried in Boarstall. He was succeeded by his nephew Thomas Aubrey.

On 9 March 1771, he married firstly Mary Colebrooke, daughter of Sir James Colebrooke, 1st Baronet and Mary Skynner,  and on 26 May 1783 secondly his cousin Martha Catherine (d. 1815), daughter of George Richard Carter, of Chilton, Buckinghamshire, and a descendant, through her mother, Julia (née Spilman), of the Willys baronets. By his first wife, he had a son, John (1771-1777), who died of accidental poisoning; he also had an illegitimate daughter, Mary, who married Samuel Whitcombe, of Hempstead Court, Gloucestershire.

References

External links 
 

|-

1739 births
1826 deaths
Alumni of Christ Church, Oxford
Baronets in the Baronetage of England
Lord High Treasurers
Lords of the Admiralty
Members of the Parliament of Great Britain for English constituencies
British MPs 1768–1774
British MPs 1774–1780
British MPs 1780–1784
British MPs 1784–1790
British MPs 1790–1796
British MPs 1796–1800
Members of the Parliament of the United Kingdom for English constituencies
People educated at Westminster School, London
UK MPs 1801–1802
UK MPs 1802–1806
UK MPs 1806–1807
UK MPs 1807–1812
UK MPs 1812–1818
UK MPs 1818–1820
UK MPs 1820–1826
Place of birth unknown